Gilbert Genesta (born as Royden Joseph Gilbert Raison DelaGenesta; March 29, 1878 – November 9, 1930) was an American escape artist and magician who died while performing a water barrel escape.

Biography
He first became interested in magic sometime about 1890 when he witnessed a school house show in Foxburg, Pennsylvania. He went on to perform professionally as Genesta, the wizard of wonders.

Death
On November 9, 1930, Genesta was performing a trick in a vaudeville theater in Frankfort, Kentucky. He would attempt to escape from a water-filled milk can, a trick made famous by Harry Houdini. Prior to the performance his milk can had been dropped, damaging the secret escape hatch and rendering it inoperable. Genesta's assistants were unaware of this, and he drowned before he could be freed.

References 

1878 births
1930 deaths
American magicians
Burials at Frankfort Cemetery
Deaths by drowning in the United States
Escapologists
People from Ashland, Kentucky